The Grand Wizard may refer to:

 Ernie Roth
 Grand Wizard, a title in the hierarchy of the Ku Klux Klan